The Kern High School District (KHSD) is a public high school system headquartered in Bakersfield, California that serves the county of Kern located at the southern end of the San Joaquin Valley. The Kern High School District has more than 35,000 students and 3,500 employees. Founded in 1893, the district includes:

19 comprehensive campuses
5 alternative education campuses 
2 career technical education sites
4 special education centers

Schools

References

External links 
Kern High School District website
Archive of previous Kern High School District website

School districts established in 1893
School districts in Kern County, California
1893 establishments in California